Kurai Taji Station (KI) is a railway station located at Balai Kurai Taji, South Pariaman, Pariaman. The railway station, which is located at an altitude of +15 meters, is included in the Regional Division II West Sumatra. The railway station is not far from the traditional market.

Services 
There is only one passenger train journey, namely Sibinuang towards  and towards .

References

External links 
  

Pariaman
Railway stations in West Sumatra
Railway stations opened in 1908
1908 establishments in the Dutch East Indies